Robert Baumle Meyner (July 3, 1908 – May 27, 1990) was an American Democratic Party politician and attorney who served as the 44th governor of New Jersey from 1954 to 1962. Before being elected governor, Meyner represented Warren County in the New Jersey Senate from 1948 to 1951.

Early life
Meyner was born on July 3, 1908, in Easton, Pennsylvania, to Gustave Herman Meyner, Sr. (1878–1950) and Maria Sophia Bäumle (1881–1968). His father was a German American silk worker from Manchester, New Hampshire. His mother was German, but born in Birsfelden near Basel, in Switzerland, to Robert Bäumle from Harpolingen, Baden and to Franziska Oliva Thüring from Istein, Baden. Robert had an older brother, Gustave Herman Meyner Jr. (1907–1996). He also had a younger sister, Olive F. Meyner Wagner (1913–1982).

In 1916, the Meyner family moved across the state border to Phillipsburg, New Jersey. They briefly settled in Paterson, New Jersey but had returned to Phillipsburg by 1922. Meyner graduated from Phillipsburg High School
in 1926, and entered Lafayette College, where he majored in government and law.  He was a brother of the Alpha Chi Rho fraternity. In 1928, Meyner formed a club supporting Al Smith as a presidential candidate in the 1928 United States presidential election. Smith was the nominee of the Democratic Party but lost the election to Herbert Hoover of the Republican Party.

In his senior year, Meyner was editor in chief of "The Lafayette", a student newspaper.
After his graduation, he moved on to Columbia Law School, where he was awarded an LL.B. degree in 1933.

While still in school, Meyner had been employed as an apprentice coremaker by the Warren Foundry and Pipe Corporation and Ingersoll Rand. During his college years, Meyner was employed as a weaver by the Gunning Silk Company. Following his graduation from Columbia, Meyner found employment as a law clerk in Union City. He was employed by J. Emil Walscheid and Milton Rosenkranz from February, 1933 to April, 1936.

Career

Meyner returned to Phillipsburg in 1936, where he quickly became a well-known trial lawyer.

During World War II, Meyner served as an officer in the Navy, and he was discharged with the rank of lieutenant commander.

New Jersey Senate
Meyner's prominent involvement in civic and social affairs, as well as the recognition it generated, helped him in 1941 during his first bid for elected office. He lost a campaign for a seat in the New Jersey Senate by only fifty votes.

After a failed run for federal office, he was elected to the state senate in 1947. Though he was the Senate Minority Leader in 1950, Meyner lost his seat in the election of 1952.

Governor of New Jersey

The ailing New Jersey Democratic Party chose Meyner as its gubernatorial candidate in 1953, and he achieved a surprise victory, boosted by a minor scandal surrounding his opponent, Paul L. Troast. Meyner's first term was marked by strong support for state education and a general restructuring of the government.

While in his first term as governor, Meyner uncovered Employment Security Division Director (and former governor) Harold G. Hoffman's massive corruption scam, and suspended Hoffman on March 18, 1954. Meyner defeated Malcolm Forbes handily in 1957 in his bid for re-election.

Meyner left office in January 1962. At the time, New Jersey's constitution prohibited governors from serving more than two consecutive terms, but did not place a limit on the total number of terms. After his Democratic successor, Richard J. Hughes had served two terms and was unable to run for a third, the Democratic Party turned back to Meyner as their gubernatorial candidate in 1969. But after 16 years of Democratic administrations, Republican William T. Cahill won election over Meyner.

Presidential campaign
In 1958, Time Magazine recognized Meyner as a potential candidate for the 1960 Democratic presidential nomination and featured him on the cover of their November 24 edition of that year (along with five other noteworthy Democrats, including John F. Kennedy and Lyndon B. Johnson).

At the 1960 Democratic National Convention Meyner received 43 votes for president, finishing fifth behind John F. Kennedy (806 votes), Lyndon Johnson (409 votes), Stuart Symington (86 votes) and Adlai Stevenson (79.5 votes) and just ahead of Hubert Humphrey who received 41 votes.

Later career
In 1962, Meyner and Stephen B. Wiley formed the law firm of Meyner and Wiley in Newark, New Jersey.

Marriage
Meyner married Helen Stevenson Meyner on January 19, 1957, in Oberlin, Ohio. Helen Meyner served in the U.S. House of Representatives from 1975 until 1979.

Death
Meyner had a stroke in 1986 and died on May 27, 1990, in Captiva, Florida.

References

External links
New Jersey Governor Robert Baumie Meyner, National Governors Association
"Dead Governors of New Jersey" biography for Robert B. Meyner.
Robert B. Meyner, The Political Graveyard.

1908 births
1990 deaths
United States Navy personnel of World War II
American people of German descent
American Protestants
Democratic Party governors of New Jersey
Democratic Party New Jersey state senators
Politicians from Easton, Pennsylvania
People from Phillipsburg, New Jersey
Phillipsburg High School (New Jersey) alumni
Lafayette College alumni
Columbia Law School alumni
United States Navy officers
Candidates in the 1960 United States presidential election
20th-century American politicians
20th-century American Episcopalians
Military personnel from Pennsylvania
Military personnel from New Jersey